Benjamin Austin (born 16 July 1982) is an Australian sailor. He competed for Australia at the 2008 Summer Olympics.

Together with teammate Nathan Outteridge, Austin became the 2008 World Champion in the 49er boat by finishing in front of Britons Stevie Morrison and Ben Rhodes. In 2007 they won the bronze medal in the same event at the World Championships in Cascais, Portugal. He was an Australian Institute of Sport scholarship holder.

Career highlights
World Championships
2007 – Cascais,  3rd, 49er (with Nathan Outteridge)
2008 – Melbourne,  1st, 49er (with Nathan Outteridge)
Other achievements
2007 – Sydney, Sydney International Regatta,  1st, 49er (with Nathan Outteridge)

References

External links 
 
 
 
 
 49er World Championships
 OUTTERIDGE And AUSTIN Win 49er World Title

1982 births
Living people
Australian Institute of Sport sailors
Australian male sailors (sport)
Sailors at the 2008 Summer Olympics – 49er
Olympic sailors of Australia
49er class world champions
World champions in sailing for Australia
21st-century Australian people